Christopher Carl Bogdan is a retired United States Air Force Lieutenant General who served as the Program Executive Officer for the F-35 Lightning II Joint Program Office in Arlington, Virginia. Previously, he was the Deputy Program Executive Officer. Before that, he served as the Program Executive Officer and Program Director, KC-46 Tanker Modernization Directorate, Aeronautical Systems Center at Wright-Patterson Air Force Base  in Dayton, Ohio.

Career 
Born and raised in New York City, Bogdan was commissioned as a second lieutenant on June 1, 1983, at the United States Air Force Academy. After graduation, Bogdan went on to become a distinguished graduate from squadron officer school located at Maxwell Air Force Base in Alabama. Bogdan is also a distinguished graduated of the United States Air Force Test Pilot School at Edwards Air Force Base in California. Bogdan became a test pilot with more than 3,200 hours in over 35 different aircraft, including the KC-135, F-111 and F-16. , Bogdan is a senior vice president at Booz Allen Hamilton.

Education 
 1983: Distinguished graduate, Bachelor of Science degree in aeronautical engineering, U.S. Air Force Academy, Colorado Springs, Colorado
 1989: Distinguished graduate, Squadron Officer School, Maxwell AFB, Alabama
 1990: Distinguished graduate, USAF Test Pilot School, Edwards AFB, California
 1994: Master of Science degree in engineering management, with distinction, California State University, Northridge
 1995: Distinguished graduate, Air Command and Staff College, Maxwell AFB, Alabama
 1998: Air War College, by correspondence
 2000: Distinguished graduate, Master of Science degree in national resource strategy, Industrial College of the Armed Forces, Fort Lesley J. McNair, Washington, D.C.
 2005: Advanced Program Managers Course, Defense Systems Management College, Fort Belvoir, Virginia
 2006: U.S. Air Force Senior Leadership Course, Center for Creative Leadership, Greensboro, North Carolina
 2007: National Security Management Course, Maxwell School of Citizenship, Syracuse University, New York
 2013: Cyber Operations Executive Course, Air University, Maxwell AFB, Alabama

Effective dates of promotion

Major awards and decorations

References 

Year of birth missing (living people)
Living people
Place of birth missing (living people)
People from New York City
United States Air Force Academy alumni
U.S. Air Force Test Pilot School alumni
California State University, Northridge alumni
Air Command and Staff College alumni
Dwight D. Eisenhower School for National Security and Resource Strategy alumni
United States Air Force generals
Recipients of the Legion of Merit